The 1980–81 Divizia A was the sixty-third season of Divizia A, the top-level football league of Romania.

Teams

League table

Results

Top goalscorers

Champion squad

See also 

 1980–81 Divizia B

References

Liga I seasons
Romania
1980–81 in Romanian football